Julio del Carmen Escobar Ortiz (born June 8, 1945), is a former Chilean professional football (soccer) player and manager.

He created a legacy in El Salvador by winning four Primera División titles with Luis Ángel Firpo.

Honours

Manager

Club
Luis Ángel Firpo
 Primera División
 Champion (4): 1988–89 ,1997-98, Clausura 1999, Clausura 2000

References

External links
 Julio Escobar at ElSalvador.com 
 Julio Escobar at CeroaCero 

1945 births
Living people
Chilean footballers
Chilean expatriate footballers
C.D. Luis Ángel Firpo footballers
Salvadoran Primera División players
Expatriate footballers in El Salvador
Association footballers not categorized by position
Chilean football managers
Chilean expatriate football managers
C.D. Águila managers
C.D. Luis Ángel Firpo managers
El Salvador national football team managers
F.C. Motagua managers
Chilean expatriate sportspeople in El Salvador
Expatriate football managers in El Salvador
Chilean expatriate sportspeople in Honduras
Expatriate football managers in Honduras